Tetracheilostoma is a genus of snakes in the family Leptotyphlopidae. All of the species were previously placed in the genus Leptotyphlops.

The genus contains the following species:

 Tetracheilostoma bilineatum, two-lined blind snake
 Tetracheilostoma breuili, St. Lucia threadsnake
 Tetracheilostoma carlae, Barbados threadsnake

References

 
Snake genera